LTIMindtree Limited is an Indian multinational information technology services and consulting company based in Mumbai. A subsidiary of Larsen & Toubro, the company was incorporated in 1996 and employs more than 90,000 people.

History

The company was founded as L&T Information Technology Ltd in December 1996 as a subsidiary of Larsen & Toubro. During 2001–2002 the company's name was changed from L&T Information Technology Limited to Larsen & Toubro Infotech Limited and in the same year the company achieved the assessed level of Software Engineering Institute's (SEI) Maturity Level 5.

In 2013–14, L&T Infotech's engineering services segment and parent Larsen & Toubro's design and engineering division were consolidated under a pure play engineering, research and development services company called L&T Technology Services.

The company rebranded itself as 'LTI' with a tag line of 'Let's Solve' in May 2017.

Mindtree merger
In May 2022, it was announced that Mindtree, which was the other IT services subsidiary of Larsen & Toubro, will be merged into LTI, and the company will be renamed as LTIMindtree. Larsen & Toubro Group chairman A. M. Naik commented that there was not much overlap between the two companies in terms of industries and clientele; LTI was present in oil and gas sector, while Mindtree had a strong presence in sectors such as travel and hospitality.

The merger was completed in November 2022. After the merger, LTIMindtree became India's fifth largest provider of IT services by market capitalisation and sixth largest by revenue. Shares of Mindtree were delisted and shareholders were allotted 73 shares of LTI for every 100 shares of Mindtree held. The parent company, Larsen & Toubro, held a 68.73% stake in the merged entity.

Global presence 

LTI has its presence across the following regions:
 India:

Mumbai                   – (Powai, Airoli, Mahape)
Pune                     – (Shivajinagar, Hinjawadi)
Bangalore      – (Whitefield)
Chennai                  – (Manapakkam)
Coimbatore - (Rathinam TechZone)
Hyderabad                – (Kokapet)
Kochi                – (Infopark)
Kolkata                   – (New Town, Salt Lake)

 North America: Canada, Mexico, United States.
 Europe: United Kingdom, Germany, Denmark, France, Sweden, Norway, Finland, Belgium, Ireland, Netherlands, Poland, Spain, Luxembourg, Switzerland
 Middle East: Kuwait, United Arab Emirates, Saudi Arabia, Qatar
 South America: Costa Rica
 Africa: South Africa, Morocco
 Asia Pacific: Australia, Japan, Singapore, Philippines, China, Thailand

Subsidiaries

Acquisitions

Awards and recognition
In January 2019, LTI and ACORD announced collaboration to drive digital adoption in the insurance industry
 In November 2018, Inclusive Tech Alliance recognized LTI President Sales Sudhir Chaturvedi among the top 100 most influential leaders in UK Tech Sector 
 In January 2018, LTI CEO and MD Sanjay Jalona chosen as Exemplary CEO of the Year by BW Business World
 In 2014, LTI ranked number 6 in India IT companies in 2013–2014,2014–2015 and 2015–2016 by NASSCOM rating.

Controversy 
In 2016, LTI management revoked offer letter of some recruits after waiting for a period of 18 months.

See also

Mahindra Satyam
L&T Technology Services

References

External links 
  

Companies based in Mumbai
Software companies of India
Information technology consulting firms of India
Larsen & Toubro
Software companies based in Mumbai
Software companies established in 1996
1996 establishments in Maharashtra
Indian companies established in 1996
Companies listed on the National Stock Exchange of India
Companies listed on the Bombay Stock Exchange